Kilstett is a commune in the Bas-Rhin department in Grand Est in north-eastern France.

Its inhabitants are known as Kilstettois.

Geography
Kilstett is positioned about fifteen kilometres (nine miles) to the north of Strasbourg.

It has its own stop on the little railway line that connects Strasbourg with the German frontier town of Lauterbourg, and is approximately three kilometres (two miles) to the east of Junction 50 on the Autoroute A35, which is the principal north-south highway in Alsace.

Infrastructures and shops
Kilstett has a match shop, bakeries, a Crédit Mutuel bank and a pub called A l'Arbre Vert.

History

In January 1945, a German counter-offensive intended to reconquer Strasbourg was stopped at the Battle of Kilstett.

See also
 Communes of the Bas-Rhin department

References

Communes of Bas-Rhin
Bas-Rhin communes articles needing translation from French Wikipedia